The maximum-term method is a consequence of the large numbers encountered in statistical mechanics. It states that under appropriate conditions the logarithm of a summation is essentially equal to the logarithm of the maximum term in the summation.

These conditions are (see also proof below) that (1) the number of terms in the sum is large and (2) the terms themselves scale exponentially with this number. A typical application is the calculation of a thermodynamic potential from a partition function.

Example

Proof
Consider the sum

where >0 for all N. Since all the terms are positive, the value of S must be greater than the value of the largest term, and less than the product of the number of terms and the value of the largest term. So we have

Taking logarithm gives

In statistical mechanics often  will be : see Big O notation.

Here we have

References
D.A. McQuarrie, Statistical Mechanics. New York: Harper & Row, 1976.
T.L. Hill, An Introduction to Statistical Thermodynamics. New York: Dover Publications, 1987

Physical chemistry
Statistical mechanics